Hibernia is an unincorporated community in Ripley Township, Montgomery County, in the U.S. state of Indiana.

History
The name Hibernia is derived from the classical name for the island of Ireland.

Geography
It is situated along Fall Creek, a tributary of the Sugar Creek waterway that flows into the Wabash River.

References

Unincorporated communities in Montgomery County, Indiana
Unincorporated communities in Indiana